The Pau-Seco River is a river of Goiás and Tocantins states in central Brazil.

See also
List of rivers of Tocantins
List of rivers of Goiás

References
Brazilian Ministry of Transport

Rivers of Tocantins
Rivers of Goiás